Baie-de-Shawinigan (Canada 1996 Census population 265)  is a small industrial community within the City of Shawinigan in the Canadian province of Quebec. The place is named after its location on a bay of the Saint-Maurice River. For a period of time, it was also known as Belgoville because it faced the paper mill of the Belgo Canadian Pulp Company.

The place was incorporated in 1907 as the Village Municipality of Baie-de-Shawinigan, but merged into the City of Shawinigan in 1998.

It is the childhood home of former Prime Minister Jean Chrétien and since 1911 is home to Sacré-Cœur Catholic Church (Sacred Heart), which is located at 17, rue de l'Église.

Mayors

From 1907 to 1998, Baie-de-Shawinigan had its own mayor and its own city council. The mayors were:

References

Neighbourhoods in Shawinigan
Former municipalities in Quebec
Populated places disestablished in 1998